Locked Down is a 2012 album by New Orleans R&B artist Dr. John. It was well received by critics and features the Black Keys guitarist and singer Dan Auerbach as guitarist, background vocalist and producer, and Max Weissenfeldt of the Whitefield Brothers on drums.

Critical reception
The album was listed at number 15 on Rolling Stones list of the top 50 albums of 2012; the magazine wrote, "With production and corrugated guitar by Black Keys mastermind Dan Auerbach, the 72-year-old mixes rock, funk and even Afrobeat to describe a soggy wasteland where honest men have equal fear of the KKK and the CIA."

At the 2013 Grammy Awards, Locked Down won the Grammy Award for Best Blues Album.

Track listing

Personnel

Musicians
Dr. John - composer, keyboards, primary artist, vocals 
Dan Auerbach - composer, guitar, mixing, percussion, producer, vocals (background) 
Max Weissenfeldt - composer, drums, percussion, vocals (background) 
Leon Michels - composer, keyboards, percussion, vocals (background), woodwind
Nick Movshon - bass (electric), bass (upright), composer, percussion, vocals (background) 
Richard Windmann - bass (electric), composer
Brian Olive - composer, guitar, percussion, vocals (background), woodwind 
The McCrary Sisters (Regina, Ann & Alfreda) - background vocals

Technical 
Produced by Dan Auerbach
Recorded and mixed at Easy Eye Sound, Nashville, TN
Engineered by Collin Dupuis
Mixed by Dan Auerbach and Collin Dupuis
Studio assistance by Danny Tomczak
Mastered by Brian Lucey at Magic Garden Mastering
Art direction and photo coloring by Michael Carney
Dr. John photographs by Joshua Black Wilkins
Studio photographs by Alysse Gafkjen
Album notes by Gabe Soria

References 

Albums produced by Dan Auerbach
Dr. John albums
Grammy Award for Best Blues Album
Nonesuch Records albums
2012 albums